Richland Creek is a stream in the western part of Nashville, Tennessee, in Davidson County. It winds for  through the Nashville suburbs of Belle Meade and Forest Hills and eventually flows into the Cumberland River  near Rock Harbor Marina at the end of Robertson Avenue.  This is one of at least five streams by the name of "Richland Creek" in various regions of Tennessee.

Geography

  The Richland Creek Watershed consists of  within the city of Nashville, approximately 4 miles west of downtown. The Richland Creek watershed includes at least eight tributaries, not all of which are named:
Jocelyn Hollow Branch (roughly follows Jocelyn Hollow Road)
Vaughn's Gap Branch (follows Harding Pike)
Chickering Branch (along Chickering Road)
Belle Meade Branch (follows Harding Place)
Sugartree Creek (follows Woodmont Boulevard)
Bosley Springs Branch (near St. Thomas Hospital)
Murphy Road Branch (along Murphy Road)
and smaller unnamed tributaries

Its mouth is a south branch of the Cumberland River shown at these coordinates: . Its source is in west Nashville and consists of the confluence of at least eight streams. One is near Tyne Boulevard at Fredericksburg Drive and mostly follows Tyne northwest toward Belle Meade Boulevard. There it is joined by a Chickering Branch arising near Chickering Lane and flowing along the east side of Chickering Road. After crossing under Belle Meade Boulevard, Richland Creek is joined by its Belle Meade Branch (which flows roughly parallel to Harding Place west of Hillsboro Road) then winds through the golf course of Belle Meade Country Club.

The creek adds a Vaughn's Gap Branch near Harding Academy and continues past Belle Meade Plantation, then receives the Jocelyn Hollow Branch (which flows from the West Meade subdivision) at a point near the intersection of Leake Avenue and Harding Road.

Richland Creek then flows past Congregation Ohabai Sholom, picks up some small springs and crosses under Harding Road (Highway 70 South) near the intersection of Belle Meade Boulevard. It merges with Sugartree Creek (which roughly follows Woodmont Boulevard) near the intersection of Harding Road and White Bridge Road.  From this point, Richland Creek meanders behind St. Thomas Hospital and Aquinas College in a northerly path along White Bridge Road. It picks up the Bosley Springs Branch and the Murphy Road Branch and flows near Briley Parkway past England Park and West Park to reach the Cumberland River at the end of Robertson Avenue. The more industrialized area of Richland Creek is at its northwest course near where it flows into the Cumberland River. As of 2016, this area included a rock quarry, a concrete mixing facility and several large petroleum bulk storage terminals.

History of environmental issues

In 1936, millions of dead fish appeared in the Cumberland River near the mouth of Richland Creek. This was believed to be from pollution by the discharging of poisonous dyestuffs into Richland Creek by factories nearby. In 1946, the city of Nashville commissioned an engineering report which found inadequate sewage disposal and recommended a sewage treatment plant and a new system of intercepting sewers. That year the Tennessean stated, "the lower reaches of Richland Creek can be considered only as a open sewer".

In 1970, complains of pollution in Richland Creek prompted an independent scientific study by a group of several university professors called "The Nashville Committee for Scientific Information". The study found that Richland Creek was being polluted not only by private industries but also by the sewer system of Nashville's Metropolitan Government. In an editorial by the Tennessean, the group was said to be serving the public interest free of political influence or financial support.  The committee reported massive pollution in Richland Creek by raw sewage from the Metro Government sewer system, as well as by bacteria and industrial wastes from the drainage ditches which flow into the creek.

Current environmental status

As of 2016, there continues to be a public health and safety contact advisory placed on Richland Creek because of chronic sewer issues– it is on The Tennessee Department of  Environment and Conservation (TDEC) 303(d) "List of Impaired Waterbodies". The U.S. Congress mandated that all states develop a Source Water Assessment Program in the "1966 Safe Drinking Water Act".  Tennessee's program was approved by the EPA in 1999. The state produces a document every two years on the status of water quality, known as the 305(b) Report.

The impairment of Richland Creek is by several contaminants, primarily stormwater runoff which flushes pollutants into Richland Creek during heavy rainstorms. Ideally, sewage and stormwater should be kept separate. When defects allow rainwater or surface water to find its way into the sewer system it decreases the capacity of the sewer to perform efficiently. This ultimately causes breaches and overflows into nearby creeks and tributaries.

In 2011, Montgomery Bell Academy began work on a geothermal installation on school property adjacent to West End Avenue. During the drilling process, sewage surfaced where the work was being done.  It was determined that when remodeling a neighboring fire station, the sewer lines were mistakenly routed to an abandoned storm sewer instead of the sanitary sewer. The sewage was sent underground to the groundwater where it entered the Richland Creek near the Bosley Springs branch. The E. coli values dropped at that site after the repair was made, but this was far from a complete answer.

Improvements made

In 2009, a Consent Decree between the US Government, the State of Tennessee, and the Metropolitan Government of Nashville and Davidson County was  entered with the US District Court for the Middle District of Tennessee. It was filed on behalf of the US Environmental Protection Agency (EPA) and the Tennessee Department of Environment and Conservation (TDEC). It included correction of sanitary sewer overflows, not just at Richland Creek but at several other sites in the city.

Construction began in 2009 on the West Park Equalization Basin and Wet Weather pump station.  This includes two above-ground tanks large enough to temporarily hold 31 million gallons of liquid when sewer flow exceeds the capacity of the treatment plant. The tanks, called "equalization facilities", hold the sewage until the stormwater recedes, then send the sewage to the treatment plant at an optimal processing rate. The project is aided by a wet-weather pump that can handle 45 million gallons per day. The West Park Project was dedicated by Mayor David Briley on August 18, 2018, and its site includes recreational facilities including a lighted softball field, basketball court, picnic area, a pavilion with public rest rooms and other amenities. Artist Eric Henn created a mural on the tank to add public art to the neighborhood.

Richland Creek Watershed Alliance, organized in 2007, is a conservation group to preserve the long term environmental stability of the watershed and has been an advocate of the creek on numerous occasions. As of 2016, the organization has engaged volunteers in removing 51 tons of trash and planted over 1700 trees along stream corridors.

Flooding

Richland Creek was involved in severe flooding in the 2010 Tennessee floods, which caused ten deaths in Nashville's Davidson County. In the aftermath, Metro Government acquired  61 flood-damaged homes in the Delray Drive area along the course of Richland Creek. The homes were torn down to develop England Park— a green space which helps absorb excess water from Richland Creek during any future flooding. The name, "England Park" was in honor of Martha and Andy England who drowned in their home in the flood of 2010. The project was financed by federal and state funding along with stormwater fees paid by residents in every part of the city.

Other "Richland Creeks" in Tennessee

A tributary of the Tennessee River in Rhea County (northeast of Chattanooga).
A branch of the Elk River arising in Maury County (south of Nashville), flowing by Pulaski in Giles County and into the Tennessee River below the border between Tennessee and Alabama.
A northern branch of the Holston River, about 20 miles northeast of Knoxville, flowing by the town of Rutledge in Grainger County.
An eastern tributary of the Tennessee River in Humphreys County, about 70 miles west of Nashville.

Notes

References

Rivers of Tennessee
Rivers of Davidson County, Tennessee
Geography of Nashville, Tennessee
Belle Meade, Tennessee
Tributaries of the Cumberland River